The Justice and Peace Alliance, sometimes translated as the Justice and Peace Gathering, is a moderate Shi'a political bloc in Kuwait. Of the fifty elected members of Kuwait National Assembly, only one belongs to the Justice and Peace Alliance:  Saleh Ashour.

The bloc members are followers of the Shirazi school of thought which in turn is against Hezbollah and the Islamic Republic of Iran.

References

Islamic political parties
Political parties in Kuwait
Shia Islamic political parties
Political parties established in 2004
2004 establishments in Kuwait